The list of Olympic men's ice hockey players for France consisted of 96 skaters and 17 goaltenders. Men's ice hockey tournaments have been staged at the Olympic Games since 1920 (it was introduced at the 1920 Summer Olympics, and was permanently added to the Winter Olympic Games in 1924). France has participated in ten tournaments, the first in 1920 and the most recent in 2002. France hosted the 1924, 1968, and 1992 Winter Olympics. France's best finish is fifth overall, which they achieved at both the 1924 and 1928 Winter Olympics, while their lowest finish was fourteenth, in 1968 and 2002.

Philippe Bozon has scored the most goals, with 14, assists, 9, and has the most points, 23. Denis Perez has competed in the most Olympics, appearing in five tournaments, and has played the most games of any skater, with 29.

Three players, Philippe Bozon, Jacques Lacarrière, and Philippe Lacarrière have been inducted into the International Ice Hockey Federation Hall of Fame, though Philippe Lacarrière was inducted as a builder.



Key

Goaltenders

Skaters

References

Notes

Citations

References

 
 
 
 
 
 

ice hockey
France
France